Sri Rama Rural Academy is a school in the village Chilumuru in Andhra Pradesh, India, established in 1949.

The management team of Sri Rama lives on campus.

History 
Sri Rama Rural School was established by Late Kolasani Venkata Subaiah Chowdary in 1949. In 1961, Late Kolasani Madhusudhan Rao led the school until 2004. Sri Rama is now under the leadership of Kolasani Tulasi Vishnu Prasad, Kolasani Ramana and Kolasani Rajsekhar.

Awards 
The school has received awards such as

 the Vidya Banhu Award at Ambedkar Junior College in Tenali in 1996

 the Vignana Sindhu Award from the Progressive Writers’ Association of Andhra Pradesh in 1996
 the Best Rural Education Institutions Award from Surjit Singh Barnala, Governor of Andhra Pradesh, in 2003
 the Quality Achievement Award from Rameshwar Thakur, Governor of Andhra Pradesh in 2007
 the National Gold Education Award from K. Rosaiah, Governor of Tamil Nadu in 2011
 the National Educational Excellence Award from Brands Academy, New Delhi in 2014
 the Ugadi Atmeeya Puraskaram from Abhyudoya Kalasamithi, Tenali in 2014
 the School Excellence Award by Brainfeed Magazine in 2015
 the Green Institutive School and Best in Sports Education Award by Brainfeed Magazine in 2017
 the Best Day an Boarding School Award from Centre for Educational Development (CED) in 2018
 the World 100 21st century learning Schools Education Award in Future of Learning Unconference in 2019
 the Lifetime Achievement Award from Brainfeed magazine in 2019
 the Atal Tinkering Lab by NITI Ayog in 2019
 the Green Campus Award from Wondrela, Hyderabad in 2020
Additionally, Late Kolasani Major Madhusudhana Rao received the Vidya Danakarana Award from Devineni Venkata Ramana, Minister for Primary and Secondary Education, Andhra Pradesh, during the Golden Jubilee Celebration of the college in 1999.

Sri Rama is certified with ISO 9000:2000 Certification and later got upgraded to ISO 9000:2008. Sri Rama was selected as a Training Partner to the National Digital Literacy Mission (NDLM) in 2015. Sri Rama became a CBSE affiliated School in 2020. Sri Rama was selected as Sainik School from the academic year 2022–23 by Ministry of Defense.

Academics 
Sri Rama achieved the Andhra Pradesh State sixth rank in the 2009–10 SSC (10th Class) Public Examinations and the 7th rank in 2010–11. It was the state second in Junior Intermediate 2011–12 results.

Sri Rama placed 3rd in the IIT Roorkee Cognizance in Ethical Hacking and cyber security workshop in 2018.

Athletics 
Sri Rama won the Eenadu T20 cricket State championship in 2013. Andhra Cricket Association chose Sri Rama as a Rural Sub Center for Cricketing Excellence. 

The school hosted the 59th School Games Federation U-19 (Boys and Girls) Inter District Handball tournament in November 2013. It also hosted the 63rd School Games Federation U-19 Andhra Pradesh Hand Ball Tournament.

Sri Rama hosted the 53rd School Games Federation U-19 (Boys and Girls) Inter District Volleyball tournament in December 2013.

The school won 2nd South Zone Speed Ball Inter District State Championship in 2014.

Sri Rama won 3 Bronze medals in a National Wheel Chair Fencing competition held at Imphal, Manipur in 2018. 

Schools in Guntur district
Educational institutions established in 1949
1949 establishments in India